2003 Belarusian First League was the thirteenth season of 2nd level football championship in Belarus. It started in April and ended in November 2003.

Team changes from 2002 season
Three top teams of last season (Darida Minsk Raion, Naftan Novopolotsk and Lokomotiv Minsk) were promoted to Belarusian Premier League. Due to the expansion of Premier League from 14 to 16 clubs, the promoted teams were replaced by only one team that finished at the bottom of 2002 Belarusian Premier League table (Lokomotiv-96 Vitebsk).

One team that finished at the bottom of 2002 season table (Osipovichi) relegated to the Second League. They were replaced by three best teams of 2002 Second League (MTZ-RIPO Minsk, Pinsk-900 and Vertikal Kalinkovichi).

Lokomotiv-96 Vitebsk shortened their name to Lokomotiv Vitebsk before the start of the season.

Teams and locations

League table

Top goalscorers

See also
2003 Belarusian Premier League
2002–03 Belarusian Cup
2003–04 Belarusian Cup

External links
RSSSF

Belarusian First League seasons
2
Belarus
Belarus